Hillegass is a surname. Notable people with the surname include:

Aaron Hillegass (born 1969), American writer
Clifton Hillegass (1918–2001), American publisher

See also
Hillegas